Krisztián Jordanov (born 15 April 1976) is a Hungarian gymnast. He competed at the 1996 Summer Olympics.

References

External links
 

1976 births
Living people
Hungarian male artistic gymnasts
Olympic gymnasts of Hungary
Gymnasts at the 1996 Summer Olympics
Gymnasts from Sofia